Acitheca is a genus of fungi within the Gymnoascaceae family. This is a monotypic genus, containing the single species Acitheca purpurea.

References

External links
 Acitheca at Index Fungorum

Onygenales
Monotypic Eurotiomycetes genera